Bois-Bernard is a commune in the Pas-de-Calais department in the Hauts-de-France region in northern France.

Geography
The village is mainly a farming village located 10 miles (16 km) northeast of Arras on the D919 and D46 roads. It is located on the edge of First World War battlefields, and spent munitions are regularly uncovered by farmers.

History
The village has had various names over the centuries:
1162 : Nemus Bernardi,
1221 : Boscus Bernardi,
1289 : Le Bos Biernart,
1362 : Bosbernart,
1452 : Boz-Bernard
1720 : Le Bois-Bernard.

During World War I, the village was destroyed. It was awarded the Croix de Guerre on the 25 September 1920.

Population

Sights
 The church of Notre-Dame, rebuilt after the destruction of the village during World War I.
 The ruins of a 13th-century castle.

Twinning
The village is twinned with the village of Grendon in Northamptonshire, England.

References

External links

 Official website 

Communes of Pas-de-Calais
Recipients of the Croix de Guerre (France)
Artois